Elio Locatelli (15 April 1943 – 27 November 2019) was an Italian speed skater and a technic commissioner (exactly direttore tecnico dell'alto livello in Italian language) of the Italy national athletics team.

Biography
Before becoming a sports manager, in his sports career, he participated at two editions of the Winter Olympics. He had been in charge of the women's sector from 1987 to 1988 and was the only manager (men and women) from 1989 to 1994. He was back in the lead of the Italian national athletics team after 23 years, at no younger age of 74.

Achievements

See also
Technic commissioners of FIDAL

References

External links

Elio Locatelli profile at FIDAL Piemonte web site

1943 births
2019 deaths
Italian male speed skaters
Speed skaters at the 1964 Winter Olympics
Speed skaters at the 1968 Winter Olympics
Italian athletics coaches
Olympic speed skaters of Italy
20th-century Italian people
21st-century Italian people